Lingewaard is a municipality in the eastern Netherlands. It is located in the province of Gelderland, in the most eastern part of the Betuwe. The municipality is situated in the lowlands between the major cities of Arnhem and Nijmegen, where most inhabitants work. Lingewaard was part of the Arnhem–Nijmegen metropolitan area until 2015.

Population centres
The municipality of Lingewaard consists of the undermentioned population centres. Lingewaard was formed in 2001 as a merger between the former municipalities of Bemmel, Gendt and Huissen. The municipality was initially named Bemmel after the largest former municipality, but later renamed 'Lingewaard' in a referendum. 'Lingewaard' itself is not a population centre but an artificial name for the municipality, which is favoured by the majority of the voters. 

The industrial park and hamlet of Looveer (included with Loo) comprises a small area located across the Pannerden Canal. Other notable hamlets in Lingewaard are Hulhuizen (included with Gendt), and Doornik (included with Bemmel). Before 1799, Doornik was a village. This village was destroyed because of a levee breach in 1799, whereby all houses were destroyed, including the church.

Landscape

The municipality lies entirely within the catchment area of the rivers Waal, Nederrijn, and Linge. It generally contains many fertile soils that lie on nutrient-rich river deposits. From an agricultural point of view, Lingewaard is well suited for horticulture. The area contains many greenhouses and orchards.

In the south of Lingewaard lies Dutch rewilding area Gelderse Poort, which is managed by Staatsbosbeheer. This nature reserve contains several Dutch riverscape habitats, including: riparian forests, grasslands, small marshes and kolks. Large herbivores (horses and cattle) roam through parts of the area, and play a major role in the landscape character because of their grazing behaviour.

Notable residents
Notable people from the municipality of Lingewaard include:

 Willem Jacob van de Graaf (born 1736 in Huissen – 1804), the 35th Dutch Governor of Ceylon
 Syb Talma (born 1864 in Angeren – 1916), a Dutch politician
 Gys van Beek (born 1919 in Angeren – 2015), a Dutch-American inventor and member of the Dutch resistance
 Joop Puntman (born 1934 in Haalderen – 2013), a Dutch ceramist and sculptor
 Cor Melchers (born 1954 in Huissen – 2015), a Dutch painter 
 Annelies Nuy (born 1960 in Doornenburg), a Dutch fashion designer
 Thomas van Aalten (born 1978 in Huissen), a Dutch writer and journalist
 Ruben Hein (born 1982 in Bemmel) – Dutch jazz musician

Sport 
 Erwin van de Looi (born 1972 in Huissen), a Dutch football manager and former player
 Stijn Schaars (born 1984 in Gendt), a Dutch former footballer with over 300 club caps

Annual festivals

Notable annual festivals and events in Lingewaard include:
 International Four Days Marches Nijmegen – A multiple day marching event in mid-July, which comes through Bemmel and Huissen. Depending on the edition, it will be on the first or fourth day.
 Bemmelse Dweildag – An international festival for marching bands in Bemmel, on the second Sunday in June.
 Horse Days of Bemmel (Dutch: Bemmelse Paardendagen) – The annual pony market and horserace in Bemmel, around the second Sunday in August.
 Cherry Festival of Gendt (Dutch: Gendste Kersenfeest) – Annual festival of Gendt at the end of July.
 Under The Milky Way – Local rock festival of Lingewaard, located in the floodplains of Huissen, in the end of August or beginning of September.

Gallery

Twin towns
From 2009 to 2014, Lingewaard was twinned with:

Trivia
 On 22 August 2018, an assault was committed on the municipal building of Lingewaard in Bemmel. A man drove into the building with a car with two gas cylinders in it. One of the gas cylinders exploded and caused serious fire and soot damage to the building. The driver died.

References

External links

 
Municipalities of Gelderland
Municipalities of the Netherlands established in 2003